Capparis orientalis is a species of plants in the family Capparaceae.

Sources

References 

orientalis
Flora of Malta